HAT-P-13, also known as GSC 03416-00543, is a G-type main sequence star approximately 800 light-years away in the constellation Ursa Major. In 2009 it was discovered that this star is orbited by two massive planets, the innermost of which transits the star. This was the first known example of an extrasolar transiting planet with an additional planet in the same system.

In 2015, a spectroscopic study have revealed a very strong starspot activity of the HAT-P-13 star.

Planetary system
As of 2009, HAT-P-13 has been confirmed to have two extrasolar planets orbiting it.  The inner planet was discovered by the "transit method" and the outer planet was found through the radial velocity method. A search for transits by HAT-P-13c was negative, however only 72% of the possible transit configurations could be ruled out. HAT-P-13 was the first star to have a transiting planet and an additional planet on a known orbit. HAT-P-7 and other planets are known to have additional companions, but there is not enough data to characterize the system. OGLE-TR-111 has one confirmed transiting planet, and one unconfirmed transiting planet.

The innermost planet, HAT-P-13b, has a mass around that of Jupiter and orbits its sun roughly every three days.  This classifies the planet as a hot Jupiter, with temperatures exceeding 1000 kelvins.  The second companion, HAT-P-13c, has a mass over 15 Jupiters.  Because of its mass, this companion could either be a massive planet or a low mass brown dwarf.  Either way, HAT-P-13 c orbits its sun every 446 days in a highly eccentric orbit.  Radial velocity measurements also suggest the existence of a third more distant companion in the system. This may be an additional planet, or it may be a brown dwarf or even a small star.

See also
 HAT-P-12
 HATNet Project
 OGLE-TR-111

References

Ursa Major (constellation)
G-type main-sequence stars
Planetary systems with two confirmed planets
Planetary transit variables